Border Post 58 is a 1951 West German crime film directed by Harry Hasso and starring Hansi Knoteck, Mady Rahl and Elise Aulinger.

Cast
 Hansi Knoteck as Anna Leitner
 Mady Rahl as Retta Schwaiger
 Elise Aulinger as Rosl
 Elisabeth Biebl as Maria Brandl
 Heinz Engelmann as Grenzoberjäger Reitlechner
 Sepp Rist as Sepp
 Ernst Fritz Fürbringer as Grenzpolizeiinspektor Hirzinger
 Hannes Keppler as Grenzoberjäger Mayer
 Willy Rösner as Leitnerbauer
 Ernst Stahl-Nachbaur as Kriminalkommissar Bernrieder
 Gustl Gstettenbaur as Grenzjäger Mitterer
 Heinz Ohlsen as Grenzjäger Schulze
 José Held as Grenzjäger Gschwendtner
 Viktor Afritsch as Kaufmann Springer
 Jochen Hauer as Dorfmüller Hauser
 Georg Vogelsang as Förster Guggemoos
 Hans Erich Pflegeras Gendermariewachtmeister Brandl
 Jutta Demeter as Teresa Pacosta
 Jeanette Heim as Sennerin
 Maria Freiberger as Lene Reitlechner
 Hans Bergmann as Kriminalassistent Prager
 Rudi Knabl as Grenzjäger Msisel
 Hermann Kowan as Untersuchungsrichter
 Emil Markgraber as Standesbeamter
 Emil Matousek
 Peter Sigmund as Grenzjäger Fiedler
 Richard Wagner as Loidl

References

Bibliography 
 Willi Höfig. Der deutsche Heimatfilm 1947–1960. F. Enke, 1973.

External links 
 

1951 films
1951 crime films
German crime films
West German films
1950s German-language films
Films directed by Harry Hasso
Films set in the Alps
German black-and-white films
1950s German films